Peter Larkin may refer to:

 Peter Anthony Larkin (1924–1996), Canadian fisheries scientist
 Peter Charles Larkin (1855–1930), Canadian entrepreneur
 Peter J. Larkin (born 1953), member of the Massachusetts House of Representatives from 1991–2005
 Peter Larkin (production designer) (1926–2019), American theatre stage designer

See also
 Peter Larkins (born 1954), doctor